Vihorlat Mountains (Vyhorliat) or colloquially Vihorlat is a volcanic mountain range in eastern Slovakia and western Ukraine. A part of the range is listed as a World Heritage Site.

Etymology
The name is of Slavic origin. Jozef Martinka suggested the origin in Ruthenian vyharj / vyhar (Slovak: výhor) - a burned forest with a groupping suffix -ať. Vygarljať, Vyhorljať - a mountain with many burned places. The Hungarian name Vihorlát derives from Slovak as an intermediate language.

Vihorlat Mountains in Slovakia
The Slovak part is 55 km long, up to 11 km broad and from 400 to 1,076 m high. It belongs to the Vihorlat-Gutin Area group of the Inner Eastern Carpathian Mountains. The middle part of the mountains is protected by the Vihorlat Protected Landscape Area.

Vihorlat is bordered by the Eastern Slovak Lowland (Východoslovenská nížina) in the south and the west. The Beskidian Southern Piedmont (Beskydské predhorie) separates Vihorlat from the Bukovské vrchy mountains and Laborecká vrchovina highlands in the north. The highest peak is Vihorlat at 1,076 m AMSL. The largest lake in the mountain range is Morské oko, which is situated at 618 m AMSL.

World Heritage Site
Kyjovský prales, a primeval beech forest in Vihorlat Mountains, was proclaimed by UNESCO to be a World Heritage Site on June 28, 2007, because of its comprehensive and undisturbed ecological patterns and processes.

Gallery

Panorama

See also 
 Vihorlat Protected Landscape Area
 Morské oko

References

External links
 Chránená krajinná oblasť Vihorlat (in Slovak)
 Protected Landscape Area Vihorlat at Slovakia.travel
 Photo gallery Vihorlat, Photo gallery Sninský kameň, Photo gallery Inversion – Vihorlat, Sninský kameň (photos of Vihorlat and Sninský kameň)
 Distant sights from Vihorlat Mountains on the portal Na obzore (in Slovak)
 

Mountain ranges of Slovakia
World Heritage Sites in Slovakia
Mountain ranges of the Eastern Carpathians
Mountain ranges of Ukraine